David Stephen Caruso (born January 7, 1956) is a retired American actor and producer, best known for his roles as Detective John Kelly on the ABC crime drama NYPD Blue (1993–94) and Lieutenant Horatio Caine on the CBS series CSI: Miami (2002–2012). He appears in the feature films An Officer and a Gentleman, First Blood (both 1982), Twins (1988), Kiss of Death (1995) and Proof of Life (2000).

Early life
Caruso was born in Forest Hills, Queens, New York, New York, the son of Joan, a librarian, and Charles Caruso, a magazine and newspaper editor. He is of Irish and Italian descent. His father left the family when David was two years old, resulting in him to "end up fathering myself". Raised as a Catholic, Caruso attended Our Lady Queen of Martyrs Catholic School in Forest Hills,  then Archbishop Molloy High School in nearby Briarwood, graduating in 1974.

Caruso worked as a cinema usher, where he would see up to 80 movies a week. He said that he and his co-workers would act out scenes from some of these movies while they were at the back of the theater. In this job he found his role models in Humphrey Bogart, James Cagney and Edward G. Robinson. He said:  "The ethics of certain actors certainly had a power over me. These guys taught me how to be what I consider the real scum of the earth."

Career

1980s
Caruso's first movie appearance was in the 1980 film Getting Wasted as Danny. He credits his role as Topper Daniels, "the cadet who nearly drowned", in An Officer and a Gentleman (1982) as what got him noticed. Caruso then spent most of the decade in supporting roles in films including First Blood (1982), Blue City (1986), China Girl (1987) and Twins (1988).

On television, Caruso had a recurring role as Tommy Mann, leader of the street gang The Shamrocks, in seven episodes of the NBC police drama series Hill Street Blues (1981–83). He portrayed U.S. Olympian James Brendan Connolly in the 1984 miniseries, The First Olympics: Athens 1896, and also appeared in two episodes of the series Crime Story.

Caruso featured in the music video for the song "Voyage, voyage" by the French singer Desireless, released in 1986.

1990s
Caruso had supporting roles as police officers in the crime films King of New York (1990) and Mad Dog and Glory (1993). While filming 1991's Hudson Hawk, he employed method acting, refusing to talk to anyone on set because his character, Kit-Kat, was mute, having had his tongue bitten off.

In 1993, Caruso landed his first major role as Detective John Kelly in the police procedural series NYPD Blue, for which he won a Golden Globe Award. TV Guide named him as one of the six new stars to watch in the 1993–1994 season. He made news by leaving the highly rated show the following year (only four episodes into the second season) after failing to obtain the raise he wanted. His decision to leave the series would later be listed in a 2010 issue of TV Guide as #6 on a list of TV's 10 biggest "blunders".

He was unable to establish himself as a leading man in films. His appearances in the 1995 thrillers Kiss of Death and Jade were met with a negative reception from critics, with both films receiving mixed reviews and poor box-office takings, and Caruso was nominated for the Golden Raspberry Award for Worst New Star for these two roles.

In 1997, Caruso returned to television as a New York City-based federal prosecutor in the short-lived CBS law drama series Michael Hayes, which aired for one season.

2000s
Caruso returned to film with a supporting role as Russell Crowe's mercenary associate in Proof of Life (2000). In 2001, he had a lead role in the cult psychological horror film Session 9, directed by Brad Anderson. Dave Kehr, writing in The New York Times, praises his performance, stating that "it is good to see David Caruso back in action, with a little more technique and a little less ego."

In 2002, Caruso returned to television in his first successful role since NYPD Blue, starring as police Lieutenant Horatio Caine in the CSI spin-off series CSI: Miami. He was the first actor in the franchise to appear as the same character on three of the four CSI programs. He was known for frequently using one-liners at the beginning of each episode. Many of these include him putting on his trademark sunglasses mid-sentence, then walking off-screen just as the main theme starts. On an episode of the Late Show with David Letterman that aired on March 8, 2007, actor and comedian Jim Carrey professed to being a fan of the show and went on to do an impersonation of Caruso, asking for an "intense close-up" from the camera, speaking in a raspy voice and putting on sunglasses. Caruso later said in an interview with CBS that he was impressed with the impersonation.

In 2012, CSI: Miami was cancelled after 10 seasons due to a decline in ratings and the climbing cost of production. Caruso was the only actor to appear in all 232 episodes of the series.

After acting
After CSI: Miami, Caruso quietly retired from acting and became involved in the art business.

Caruso is founder of DavidCarusoTelevision.tv and LexiconDigital.tv. He is co-owner of Steam on Sunset, a clothing store in South Miami.

Personal life
Caruso has a daughter, Greta, with his second wife, actress Rachel Ticotin. He and former girlfriend Liza Marquez have two children together: a son Marquez and a daughter Paloma. In April 2009, Marquez filed papers against Caruso for fraud, breach of their settlement agreement and emotional distress.

In March 2009, a woman was placed in custody in Tyrol, Austria, on charges of stalking Caruso. She had twice failed to appear in court to answer the charges before fleeing to Mexico. Following her deportation from Mexico, Austrian officials took her into custody to await trial on the stalking charges.

Awards and nominations
In 1994, Caruso won a Golden Globe Award for his John Kelly role on NYPD Blue for which he was also nominated for a Primetime Emmy Award for Outstanding Lead Actor in a Drama Series. In 2001, he was nominated for the Blockbuster Entertainment Award for Favorite Supporting Actor – Suspense for his role as Dino in the film Proof of Life.

Filmography

Film

Television

See also
 List of people from Queens

References

External links
 
 
 David Caruso Bio at CBS – CSI: Miami

1956 births
Living people
Male actors from New York City
American male film actors
American businesspeople
American people of Irish descent
American people of Italian descent
American male television actors
Archbishop Molloy High School alumni
Best Drama Actor Golden Globe (television) winners
People from Forest Hills, Queens
20th-century American male actors
21st-century American male actors